The 2015 Radford Highlanders men's soccer team will represent Radford University during the 2015 NCAA Division I men's soccer season.

Schedule 

|-
!colspan=6 style="background:#C40233; color:#FFFFFF;"| Preseason
|-

|-
!colspan=6 style="background:#C40233; color:#FFFFFF;"| Regular season
|-

|-
!colspan=6 style="background:#C40233; color:#FFFFFF;"| Big South Tournament
|-

|-
!colspan=6 style="background:#C40233; color:#FFFFFF;"| NCAA Tournament
|-

|-
!colspan=6 style="background:#C40233; color:#FFFFFF;"| NCAA Tournament — College Cup
|-

|-

References 

Radford Highlanders men's soccer seasons
Radford
Radford Highlanders, Men's Soccer Season 2015
Radford Highlanders